The 2010 TCU Horned Frogs football team represented Texas Christian University (TCU) in the 2010 NCAA Division I FBS football season. The team was coached by tenth-year head coach Gary Patterson and played its home games at Amon G. Carter Stadium in Fort Worth, Texas. They were members of the Mountain West Conference and were defending conference champions.

After a perfect regular season record, another Mountain West title and a #3 BCS ranking, the team was selected by the Pasadena Tournament of Roses to play Wisconsin of the Big Ten Conference in the 97th edition of the Rose Bowl.  They defeated the Badgers 21–19, capping off their first undefeated and untied season since 1938, and only the second overall in the school's 115-year football history. The Congrove Computer Rankings, an NCAA-designated major selector, selected TCU as national champion.

Schedule

Notes
TCU finished the regular season as the conference leader in scoring offense (520 points, 43.3 average) and scoring defense (137 points, 11.4 average). The Frogs were led by senior quarterback Andy Dalton, who completed 194 of 293 passes for 2638 yards for 26 touchdowns, and tailback Ed Wesley, who carried for 162 times for 1065 yards and scored 11 touchdowns.

Game summaries

Oregon State

Andy Dalton won his 30th career victory as TCU's starting quarterback, surpassing the school record of Sammy Baugh.

Rose Bowl

The Horned Frogs made their way to Pasadena as the first team from a BCS non-AQ conference school to play in the Rose Bowl in the BCS era. The team has recorded two consecutive perfect regular seasons and has appeared in six straight bowl games. The Rose Bowl was their second consecutive BCS bowl game.

Both teams scored double digit points in the first quarter, a Rose Bowl record. The game was close throughout, and was not decided until Wisconsin failed to convert a two-point conversion late in the fourth quarter to tie the game. The game marks second time that the Rose Bowl was decided by two points, joining the 1966 game (UCLA 14, Michigan State 12).

Rankings

Roster

References

TCU
TCU Horned Frogs football seasons
Mountain West Conference football champion seasons
Rose Bowl champion seasons
College football undefeated seasons
TCU Horned Frogs football